Cyana ellipsis is a moth of the family Erebidae. It was described by Timm Karisch and Ugo Dall'Asta in 2010. It is found in the Democratic Republic of the Congo.

References

Cyana
Moths described in 2010
Insects of the Democratic Republic of the Congo
Moths of Africa
Endemic fauna of the Democratic Republic of the Congo